Eugen Polanski (born Bogusław Eugeniusz Polański on 17 March 1986) is a Polish former professional footballer who played mainly as a defensive midfielder.

He amassed Bundesliga totals of 254 matches and 14 goals over 12 seasons, in representation of Borussia Mönchengladbach, Mainz 05 and Hoffenheim. He also competed in the Spanish La Liga, with Getafe.

Polanski appeared for Poland at Euro 2012.

Club career
Born in Sosnowiec, Poland, Polanski moved to Germany as an infant, joining Borussia Mönchengladbach's youth ranks at the age of eight. In 2004–05, on 12 February 2005, he made his debut both in the first team and the Bundesliga, in a 2–0 away loss against Werder Bremen that was his sole appearance of the season.

Polanski scored his first goal as a professional in a 1–1 home draw against Bayer 04 Leverkusen on 19 November 2005, and went on to be relatively played the following years. In 2007–08, however, as the campaign ended in promotion, he only featured in nine second division matches.

After his contract at Borussia expired in June 2008, Polanski agreed a move to La Liga with Getafe CF. During his first and only season, as the Madrid side finished just one place above the relegation zone, he was first choice, often partnering Javier Casquero in central midfield.

On 12 June 2009, Polanski was loaned out to 1. FSV Mainz 05 on a season-long spell. However, the following month, the deal was extended for another year, with the clubs reaching an agreement for a permanent switch in early November 2010.

On 25 January 2013, Polanski joined fellow top division team TSG 1899 Hoffenheim, penning a deal until June 2015.

International career
Polanski appeared for Germany at various youth levels, often as captain. He was a key member of the under-21s at the 2006 UEFA European Championship, scoring a magnificent long-range goal in the fixture against Serbia and Montenegro; his form made AS Monaco FC enquire about his services, but Mönchengladbach promptly rejected the offer.

In May 2011, Polanski confirmed his intent to play for Poland. On 26 July, he was called up by manager Franciszek Smuda for a friendly with Georgia, making his debut in the game which took place on 10 August.

Polanski was selected as part of the 23-man squad that competed in the finals played on home soil and Ukraine. He appeared in three games during the tournament, in an eventual group stage exit.

Career statistics

References

External links

1986 births
Living people
People from Sosnowiec
Polish emigrants to Germany
Naturalized citizens of Germany
German people of Polish descent
Polish people of German descent
Sportspeople from Silesian Voivodeship
Polish footballers
German footballers
Association football midfielders
Bundesliga players
2. Bundesliga players
Borussia Mönchengladbach players
1. FSV Mainz 05 players
TSG 1899 Hoffenheim players
La Liga players
Getafe CF footballers
Germany youth international footballers
Germany under-21 international footballers
Poland international footballers
UEFA Euro 2012 players
Polish expatriate footballers
German expatriate footballers
Expatriate footballers in Spain
Polish expatriate sportspeople in Spain
German expatriate sportspeople in Spain